The 1963 All-Ireland Senior Camogie Championship was the high point of the 1963 season in Camogie. The championship was won by Dublin who defeated Antrim by a 13-point margin in the final.

Structure
Cork led Dublin 2-1 to 1-1 at half time in the All Ireland semi-final at The Mardyke then stretched their lead to 3-4 to 1-2, before Una O'Connor and Mary Sherlock responded with goals and Sherlock added an equalising point three minutes from the end. Three goals each from Judy Doyle and Una O'Connor and further goals from Mary Sherlock and Brid Keenan secured Dublin's place in the final on a day that Cork's train broke down en route to Dublin.

Final
Two goals from Una O'Connor and a third from Bríd Keenan at the start of the second half secured the championship for Dublin. Agnes Hourigan wrote in the Irish Press:  The scoreline did scant justice to the see saw nature of the exchanges. Far greater craft, combination and cohesion in attack, together with a back line that made only one mistake in the full fifty minutes, despite long spells of Antrim pressure, gave Dublin the title after a scintillating game. At al times but more especially so in the second half, Antrim had as much if not more of the play than the victors but whereas the Dublin forwards scored from almost every possible opportunity, the Ulster champions blazed wide time and again when well placed. Una O’Connor, who won her tenth All Ireland medal, roamed well outfield from her normal full-forward post, and, too mobile for opposing full-back Moya Forde, distributed the bal magnificently to a brilliant pair of corner-forwards Judy Doyle and Bríd Keenan, whose well taken scores made all the difference.

Final stages

 
MATCH RULES
50 minutes
Replay if scores level
Maximum of 3 substitutions

See also
 All-Ireland Senior Hurling Championship
 Wikipedia List of Camogie players
 National Camogie League
 Camogie All Stars Awards
 Ashbourne Cup

References

External links
 Camogie Association
 Historical reports of All Ireland finals
 All-Ireland Senior Camogie Championship: Roll of Honour
 Camogie on facebook
 Camogie on GAA Oral History Project

All-Ireland Senior Camogie Championship
1963
All-Ireland Senior Camogie Championship
All-Ireland Senior Camogie Championship